The Shipka is a 9mm Bulgarian submachine gun produced in 1996 by the Bulgarian company Arsenal.  The name is a reference to the famous Shipka Pass, near Arsenal's Kazanlak headquarters, in the Balkans where Bulgarian volunteers and Russian troops defeated the Ottoman Empire during the Russo-Turkish War of 1877, thereby liberating Bulgaria. The Shipka was developed for the Bulgarian police and military.

Design
The Shipka is a compact weapon originally intended for use by armored vehicle crews, pilots, and other shooters who might require either a close-quarter weapon or aimed shots at longer ranges.

The prototype and pre-production versions of the Shipka were chambered in 9×25mm Mauser and used a 30-round box magazine. Production versions were produced in 9×18mm Makarov with a 32-round magazine. After Bulgaria's entry into NATO, a version chambered in 9×19mm Parabellum with a 25-round magazine was introduced.

The design is a straightforward blowback operation firing from open bolt. The lower receiver along with pistol grip and trigger guard is made from polymer, the upper receiver is made from steel. The simple buttstock is made from steel wire and folds to the left side of gun.

See also
 Beretta M12
 Walther MP
 Interdynamic MP-9

References 

Firearms of Bulgaria
9×18mm Makarov submachine guns
9mm Parabellum submachine guns
Military equipment introduced in the 1990s